Mukesh Chand Mathur (22 July 1923 – 27 August 1976), better known mononymously as Mukesh, was an Indian playback singer. Mukesh is considered to be one of the most popular and acclaimed playback singers of the Hindi film industry. Amongst the numerous nominations and awards he won, his song "Kai Baar Yuhi Dekha Hai" from the film Rajnigandha (1973) won him the National Film Award for Best Male Playback Singer.

Mukesh was also popular as being the voice of actors Raj Kapoor, Manoj Kumar, Feroz Khan, Sunil Dutt and Dilip Kumar.

Early life
Mukesh was born in Delhi in a Mathur Kayastha family. His parents were Zorawar Chand Mathur, an engineer, and Chandrani Mathur. He was the sixth in a family of ten children. The music teacher who came home to teach Mukesh's sister, Sundar Pyari, found a pupil in Mukesh, who would listen from the adjoining room. Mukesh left school after the 10th grade and worked briefly for the Department of Public Works.  He experimented with voice recordings during his employment in Delhi and gradually developed his singing abilities and also his musical instrumental skills.

Singing career
Mukesh's voice was first noticed by Motilal, a distant relative, when he sang at his sister's wedding. Motilal took him to Mumbai and arranged for singing lessons by Pandit Jagannath Prasad. During this period Mukesh was offered a role as an actor-singer in a Hindi film, Nirdosh (1941). His first song was "Dil Hi Bujha Hua Ho To" as an actor-singer for Nirdosh written by Neelkanth Tiwari. He first hit song as a playback singer was "Dil Jalta Hai To Jalne De" for actor Motilal in 1945 with the film Pehli Nazar with music composed by Anil Biswas and lyrics written by Aah Sitapuri.

Mukesh was such a fan of singer K. L. Saigal that in his early years of playback singing he used to imitate his idol. In fact, it is said that when K. L. Saigal first heard the song "Dil Jalta Hai...", he remarked, "That's strange, I don't recall singing that song".

Mukesh created his own singing style with the help of music director Naushad Ali, who helped Mukesh to come out of his Saigal style and create his own style. Naushad gave him songs for the film Andaz. Initially Mukesh was the ghost voice of Dilip Kumar in this movie and Mohammed Rafi sang for Raj Kapoor. He delivered many Hits for Naushad in films like: Anokhi Ada (1948), Mela (1948), Andaz (1949). Other composers who used Mukesh voice for great Dilip Kumar in hit songs like "Jeevan Sapna toot gaya" were Anil Biswas in Anokha Pyar, Ye Mera Diwanapan hai, Shankar–Jaikishan in Yahudi and Suhana Safar and Dil Tadap Tadap ke, Salil Choudhary in Madhumati. However, later Dilip Kumar choose Rafi as his ghost voice and Mukesh became the ghost voice of Raj Kapoor. Mukesh recorded highest number of songs for Shankar–Jaikishan, that is 133 songs followed by Kalyanji Anandji ie 99 songs. Out of 4 Filmfare Awards, Mukesh won 3 awards for Shankar–Jaikishan songs.

In 1974, Mukesh received National Film Award for Best Male Playback Singer for the song "Kai Baar Yuhi Dekha Hai" from Rajnigandha (1974), and Filmfare Awards for the songs "Sab Kuch Seekha Humne" in the movie Anari (1959), "Sabse Bada Naadan Wahi Hai" in Pehchaan (1970), "Jai Bolo Beimaan Ki" in Beimaan (1972) (all the three songs composed by Shankar–Jaikishan) and "Kabhi Kabhie Mere Dil Mein", the title song of film Kabhie Kabhie (1976) (composed by Khayyam). A total of around 1,300 songs were sung by him. This number is less than those sung by some of his contemporaries, but the fact is that Mukesh emphasised on quality rather than quantity. The comparatively fewer songs sung by him in the 1970s can be attributed to his failing health due to his worsening heart problem.

Mukesh sang many songs for Kalyanji Anandji music director duo. Mukesh sang more songs with the K-A duo after Shankar–Jaikishan. From "Naina hai jadoo bhare..." Bedard Zamana Kya Jane (1958) composed by Kalyanji alone as Kalyanji Virji Shah, and "Main hoon mast madari..." Madari (1959) as the first Kalyanji-Anandji-Mukesh combo, to "Chahe aaj mujhe napasand karo" Darinda 1977, the K-A, Mukesh combination gave numerous popular songs like "Chhalia mera naam...", "Mere toote hue dil se...", "Dum dum diga diga" Chalia (1959), "Mujhko iss raat ki tanhai mein..." Dil Bhi Tera Hum Bhi Tere (1960), "Hum chhod chale hain mehfil ko..." (Ji Chahta Hai), "Humne tumko pyar kiya hai jitna..." (Dulha Dulhan), "Chal mere dil lehraake chal..." Ishara and "Dheere se chalo..." Johar Mehmood in Goa, "Main to ek khwab hoon..." and "Chand si mehbooba ho..." Himalay Ki Godmein(1965), "Waqt kartaa jo wafaa..." Dil Ne Pukara, "Deewanon se yeh mat poocho..." Upkar, "Khush raho har khushi hai..." Suhaag Raat and "Humsafar ab yeh safar kat jaayega..." Juari, "Chandi ki deewaar..." and "Le chal le chal mere jeevan saathi..." Vishwas (1969), "Koi jab tumhara hriday tod de..." Purab Aur Paschim, "Darpan ko dekha..." Upaasna, "Jo tumko ho pasand..." Safar and "Mujhe nahin poochni tumse beeti baatein..." Anjaan Raahein (1970).

Out of the numerous songs he gave his voice to, "Kahin door jab din dhal Jaaye" from Anand(1971), "Ek Pyaar ka Nagma hai" from Shor (1972), "Maine Tere Liye Hi Saat Rang Ke" from Anand (1972), "Sab Kuch Seekha Humne" from Anari (1959), "Jeena yahan marna yahan" and "Kehta hai Joker" from Mera Naam Joker (1971) are the most popular among his fans and followers.

In his career, Mukesh sung 110 songs for Raj Kapoor, 46 songs for Manoj Kumar and 19 songs for Dilip Kumar.

As an actor and producer
Mukesh started his career as an actor singer in the film Nirdosh in 1941, with Nalini Jaywant as his heroine. His second film was Adab Arz in 1943. He played a guest role in Raj Kapoor's film Aah in 1953.  He acted as a hero in the film Mashooka in 1953, opposite Suraiya and in the film Anurag (1956) (he was also the co-producer and composer in the film), opposite Usha Kiran and Mridula Rani. Mukesh also produced a film Malhar (1951) with hero Arjun & heroine Shammi with Darling Films.

Appreciation 
Mukesh was a favourite of renowned Indian spin-bowler Bhagwath Chandrasekhar. When the sound of a Mukesh song drifted to the pitch, Chandrasekhar's acknowledgement of the tribute would bring a roar from the crowd. Sunil Gavaskar wrote that sometimes he hummed a Mukesh tune on the field to inspire Chandra. Chandra's passion affected team-mates Kirmani, Gundappa Viswanath, and even some journalists.

Google commemorated Mukesh on his 93rd birthday anniversary in 2016.

Personal life
Mukesh married Saral Trivedi, daughter of Raichand Trivedi, a millionaire. With no proper house, an erratic income and what was then considered in India a supposedly "immoral" profession (singer in movies), the consent of Saral's father for this marriage could not be obtained and Mukesh and Saral were forced to elope. They got married in a temple in Kandivali on 22 July 1946, Mukesh's 23rd birthday, with the help of the actor Motilal and from the residence of R. D. Mathur. Everyone made dire predictions of unhappy days and divorce, but both weathered the lean days and celebrated their thirtieth wedding anniversary on 22 July 1976, four days before his departure for the USA. The couple had five children – Rita, the singer Nitin, Nalini (d. 1978), Mohnish and Namrata (Amrita). The actor Neil Nitin Mukesh is a grandson of Mukesh (son of Nitin).

Death
Mukesh died of a heart attack on 27 August 1976 in Detroit, Michigan, USA, where he had gone to perform in a concert. That morning, he got up early and went to take a shower. He came out short of breath and complaining of chest pains. He was rushed to a hospital but was pronounced dead. The rest of the concert was completed by Lata Mangeshkar and his son Nitin Mukesh. His body was flown to India by Mangeshkar, where a grand funeral ceremony was held in the presence of several actors, with personalities of the Indian film industry and fans paying tribute. When news of his death reached his acquaintance and actor Raj Kapoor, he burst into tears, and remarked, "I have lost my voice," which is a testimony to the association of Mukesh's voice (in playback) to the immensely popular songs of Raj Kapoor's films. A famous song of the 1950s featured on Bharat Bhushan Aa laut ke aa ja mere meet is another example of his earlier melodies, as is Dil tadap tadapke keh raha hai, picturised on Dilip Kumar.

After Mukesh's death, his newer, hitherto unreleased, songs were released in 1977 in films such as Dharam Veer, Amar Akbar Anthony, Khel khiladi ka, Darinda and Chandi sona. The year 1978 also featured a considerable number of Mukesh's songs in films such as Aahuti, Paramatma, Tumhari kasam and Satyam Shivam Sundaram, where Mukesh sang his last film song Chanchal sheetal nirmal komal for Raj Kapoor's younger brother, Shashi Kapoor. From 1980 onward, Mukesh's voice was heard in many later released films such as Shaitan mujarim, Premika, Patthar se Takkar (1980), Sanjh ki Bela, Maila Anchal (1981), Aarohi (1982), Chor Mandali (1983), Nirlaj (1985), Love and God (1986), Shubh Chintak (1989), and his last known release of Chand Grahan (1997).

Awards

National Film Awards
 1974 – National Film Award for Best Male Playback Singer for the song "Kai Baar Yuhi Dekha Hai" from the film Rajnigandha

Filmfare Awards

Won

Nominated

Bengal Film Journalists' Association Awards
Winner
 1967 – Best Male Playback Singer for Teesri Kasam
 1968 – Best Male Playback Singer for Milan
 1970 – Best Male Playback Singer for Saraswatichandra

Filmography

As an actor:

As a singer:

References

External links

 
 www.SingerMukesh.com – A Dedicated Web Site To Singer Mukesh

1923 births
1976 deaths
Bollywood playback singers
Indian male playback singers
Hindu College, Delhi alumni
20th-century Indian singers
Indian Hindus
Singers from Delhi
Best Male Playback Singer National Film Award winners
Filmfare Awards winners
20th-century Indian male singers